Louden may refer to:

Louden, New Jersey, unincorporated community 
Louden, Ohio, unincorporated community 
R. Bruce and May W. Louden House, listed on the National Register of Historic Places in Jefferson County, Iowa
R. B. and Lizzie L. Louden House, Fairfield, Iowa
Louden Machinery Company, American engineering, manufacturing and design company

People with the name
 Bill Louden or "Baldy" (1883–1935), American baseball player
 Chris Louden, American animator
 George Louden (1885–1972), British cricketer
 James Keith Louden (1905–1994), American industrial engineer
 LeRoy J. Louden (born 1936), American politician in Nebraska
 Lou Louden (1919–1989), American baseball player
 Margaret Louden (1910–1998), British surgeon
 Michael Louden (1964–2004), American actor
 Robert Louden (died 1867), Confederate messenger in the American Civil War
 Sharon Louden (born 1964), American artist
 Louden Ryan (1923–2018), Irish economist and academic
 Louden Swain, fictional character in American film Vision Quest

See also

Loudon (disambiguation)
Loudoun, parish in East Ayrshire, Scotland